Janet Cobbs (born February 22, 1967) is an American/Canadian volleyball coach. During her playing career, she was an All-American at North Dakota State University and won a bronze medal with the United States national team at the 1992 Summer Olympics.

Playing career

High school
Cobbs attended Concordia Academy High School, where she played volleyball, basketball, and softball. She made the all-state team twice in both volleyball and basketball. In 1984, she led the volleyball team to the Class A state championship. In 1985, she was named the Metro Basketball Player of the Year.

College
Cobbs played for the North Dakota State University volleyball team from 1985 to 1988. She was a second team All-American in 1986 and a first team All-American in 1987. In 1988, Cobbs led the Bison to a 43-3 record and an NCAA Elite Eight appearance. She was named to the All-American first team again and was also named the Division II Player of the Year. She won the Honda-Broderick Trophy in 1988-89 as the Division II Female Athlete of the Year. Cobbs set nine NDSU school records, including most career kills (2,091) and most single-season kills (739). She was inducted into the North Dakota State University Hall of Fame in 2003.

International
Cobbs was a member of the U.S. national team from 1989 to 1994. She won the bronze medal with the U.S. at the 1992 Summer Olympics. She was named the MVP of the 1992 Hong Kong Cup.

Professional
Cobbs played professionally for the Minnesota Monarchs (U.S.) in 1988-89, Ceramica Magica (Italy) in 1993-94, and Vakifbank (Turkey) in 1996-97.

Coaching career
Cobbs was an assistant coach for North Dakota State and the University of Wisconsin–River Falls.

Cobbs is currently a head coach for The Cambridge Scorpions Volleyball Program in Ontario Canada

Personal
Cobbs was born in Garden Grove, California. She is 6 feet tall.

References

1967 births
Living people
Olympic bronze medalists for the United States in volleyball
Volleyball players at the 1992 Summer Olympics
North Dakota State Bison women's volleyball players
Sportspeople from Orange County, California
Volleyball players from California
People from Garden Grove, California
Wisconsin–River Falls Falcons coaches
American women's volleyball players
Medalists at the 1992 Summer Olympics
Expatriate volleyball players in Italy
Expatriate volleyball players in Turkey
American expatriate sportspeople in Italy
American expatriate sportspeople in Turkey